Werner Kurt Rey (born October 6, 1943) is a UK-based Swiss businessman, financier and convicted fraudster. In 1976, Rey acquired the fashion house Bally, and subsequently sold it to the Oerlikon Bührle concern, which laid the foundation of his Omni Holding AG, which would at its peak have assets under management exceeding $4 billion.

Subsequently, his investor and venture capitalist career took off from that of an initiator of hostile take-overs to that of a USD billionaire white knight in various international M&A deals ranging from real estate to engineering works, electronics, media and financial services, in which he himself served occasionally as guarantor to institutional lenders.

Early life and education 
Werner Kurt Rey was born October 6, 1943 in Zurich, Switzerland. He was the son of a physician (MD) and initially wanted to enter medical studies at the University of Zurich, but failed the admissions exam. Instead he completed a commercial apprenticeship at the private bank Rüd, Blass & Cie. AG in Zurich, which was later merged with the wealth management of Deutsche Bank. Rey graduated best of his class.

Career 
Rey launched his career while working for a London-based company from 1961 to 1963, which was followed by several non-executive and executive positions in Geneva, namely at the controversial investment firm Investors Overseas Service (IOS) founded by American financier Bernard Cornfeld in 1955, where he became deputy director. In 1969, he began to work as an independent consultant and corporate advisor, until 1975.  He also held a management role at an international bank.

In 1976, Rey, acquired share majority of the fashion house Bally and subsequently sold it to Oerlikon-Bührle, an industrial concern, with a profit of $60 million (which would be equivalent to $312 million in 2023). This laid the foundation for his Omni Holding AG which would soon turn into an industrial conglomerate with several thousand employees. Rey held controlling interest in Metallwerke Selve AG (Selve Metal Works) in Thun, media and publishing giant Jean Frey AG in Zurich, temporary employment agency Adia Interim (today a part of Adecco), commodity inspection comapany Inspectorate International as well as 30% of controlling interest in Sulzer. Until 1990, Rey was a well respected Swiss financier, and had about $4 billion in AUM.

Since his fraud trial and prison sentence, he has apparently returned to London (where his wife is from) and is again active in the field of participations and finance.

Case against Werner K. Rey 
During the recession of 1990/91 Omni Holding AG began having substantial financial issues. In 1991, the company became insolvent, and had to file bankruptcy. After Swiss authorities filed a case against Werner K. Rey on several allegations of fraud, falsification of documents, and fraudulent bankruptcy, he fled to The Bahamas, where he was arrested in 1996. This was among the most spectacular white collar crimes of Switzerland and one of the largest corporate bankruptcies similar to Swissair. He was subsequently extradited to Switzerland to face criminal justice.

In 1998, he was put on trial for an attempt to defraud the Cantonal Bank of Bern when Inspectorate went public and for fraudulent bankruptcy because he had reduced his private assets at the expense of the creditors - whether for appearances or with good intentions could not be clarified. Accordingly, the sentence of four years in prison was well below the ten years demanded by the prosecutor. Further proceedings for commercial fraud, forgery of documents and fraudulent bankruptcy expired in 2007. The pending proceedings were therefore dismissed. Rey kept the judiciary in suspense for years and owes the Canton of Bern around CHF 4.3 million in court costs alone.

Rey was released from prison on June 14, 2000.

Private 
Rey is married and resides in London.

References

Living people
1943 births